The Washington Cotton Factory was built in 1865-67 on Mill Creek near Washington, Utah by Mormon settlers to process locally grown cotton for use by the settlers. The region of the Virgin River valley became known among Mormons as the "Cotton Mission," a project envisioned by Brigham Young to establish Mormon self-sufficiency.

The mill encountered difficulties in finding a reliable supply of raw cotton and suffered from an erratic water flow. It operated on and off until 1898, when it was permanently closed. It was subsequently used as a warehouse.

The sandstone building was initially completed with one story. Two more stories were added by 1870 to meet demand. A reservoir near the mill could provide ten hours of operation from fourteen hours of stored water.

The Washington Cotton Factory was listed on the National Register of Historic Places on April 16, 1971.

References

External links
 

Industrial buildings and structures on the National Register of Historic Places in Utah
Industrial buildings completed in 1867
Buildings and structures in Washington County, Utah
Historic American Buildings Survey in Utah
Cotton mills in the United States
National Register of Historic Places in Washington County, Utah
1867 establishments in Utah Territory